Soundtek is one of the famous old record label companies in Bangladesh, which produces Cassettes, CDs, VCDs and DVDs. Soundtek is one of the premier record labels in Bangladesh. The owner of the company is Sultan Mahmud.

History
In 1992, Soundtek was established by Sultan Mahmud. Soundtek YouTube channel crossed 1 million subscribers within just 1 year. The company has published over 1500 albums since 1992.

Types
 Audio album and video album, music video.

Artists

Musicians

 Asif Akbar

 Ayub Bachchu

 Andrew Kishore

 Partha Barua

 Minar Rahman

 Ferdous Wahid

 Shafin Ahmed

Atikur Rahman Mahi

 Rakib Mosabbir

 Zhilik

Bands

 Mukhosh

 Souls

 Warfaze

 Ark

 Feedback

Sister channel
 Sundtek General
 Soundtek Dramma
 Soundtek Music

References

External links
 Official Website

Bangladeshi record labels
Record label distributors
Record labels established in 1992
1992 establishments in Bangladesh
Entertainment companies established in 1992